Markus Wüst (born December 26, 1971). is a former Swiss nordic combined skier who competed from 1990 to 1995. He won a bronze medal in the 4 x 5 km team event at the 1995 FIS Nordic World Ski Championships in Thunder Bay, Ontario.

Wüst's earned two individual career victories, both in the 15 km event in 1993 and 1995.

External links 

Swiss male Nordic combined skiers
Olympic Nordic combined skiers of Switzerland
Nordic combined skiers at the 1994 Winter Olympics
1971 births
Living people
FIS Nordic World Ski Championships medalists in Nordic combined